William Hocking may refer to:
 Bill Hocking, Cornish fisherman
 William Ernest Hocking, American philosopher
 William John Hocking, British numismatist